Evan Morgan may refer to:
 Evan Morgan, 2nd Viscount Tredegar, Welsh poet and author
 Evan Morgan (filmmaker)